The 2022 Tour of Norway is a men's road cycling stage race which takes place from 24 to 29 May 2022. It is the 11th edition of the Tour of Norway, which is rated as a 2.Pro event on the 2022 UCI ProSeries calendar.

Teams 
Nine UCI WorldTeams, six UCI ProTeams, and three UCI Continental teams made up the eighteen teams that participated in the race.

UCI WorldTeams

 
 
 
 
 
 
 
 
 

UCI ProTeams

 
 
 
 
 
 

UCI Continental Teams

Schedule

Stages

Stage 1 
24 May 2022 – Bergen to Voss,

Stage 2 
25 May 2022 – Ulvik to Geilo,

Stage 3 
26 May 2022 – Gol to Stavsro/Gaustatoppen,

Stage 4 
27 May 2022 – Hovden to Kristiansand,

Stage 5 
28 May 2022 – Flekkefjord to Sandnes,

Stage 6 
29 May 2022 – Stavanger to Stavanger,

Classification leadership table 

 On stage 2, Tobias Halland Johannessen, who was second in the points classification, wore the dark blue jersey, because first placed Remco Evenepoel wore the orange jersey as leader of the general classification. For the same reason, Luke Plapp who was second in the young rider classification, wore the white jersey.
 On stages 4 and 5, Joel Nicolau, who was second in the mountains classification, wore the polkadot jersey, because first placed Remco Evenepoel wore the orange jersey as leader of the general classification. For the same reason, Luke Plapp who was second in the young rider classification, wore the white jersey.
 On stage 6, Luke Plapp, who was second in the young rider classification, wore the white jersey, because first placed Remco Evenepoel wore the orange jersey as leader of the general classification.

Final classification standings

General classification

Points classification

Mountains classification

Young rider classification

Team classification

References

External links 
 

2022
Tour of Norway
Tour of Norway
Tour of Norway